Gerald William Clayton (born May 11, 1984) is a Dutch-born American jazz pianist, composer and bandleader.

Biography
Clayton attended the Los Angeles County High School for the Arts; USC's Thornton School of Music, where he studied piano with Billy Childs; and the Manhattan School of Music, where he studied with Kenny Barron.

He has performed and recorded with Roy Hargrove, Diana Krall, Ben Wendel, Dianne Reeves, Terri Lyne Carrington, Ambrose Akinmusire, Dayna Stephens, Kendrick Scott, Ben Williams, Terell Stafford & Dick Oatts, Michael Rodriguez, Avishai Cohen, Sachal Vasandani, Gretchen Parlato, and the Clayton Brothers Quintet. Clayton also has enjoyed an extended association since early 2013, touring and recording with saxophone legend, Charles Lloyd. 2016 marks his second year as Musical Director of the Monterey Jazz Festival On Tour, a project that features his trio with Ravi Coltrane, Nicolas Payton, and Raul Midón.

In 2012 and 2013, Clayton received Grammy nominations for The Paris Sessions (Concord) and Life Forum (Concord). In 2010, he was nominated for Best Instrumental Composition for "Battle Circle", which is featured on the Clayton Brothers album, New Song and Dance. In 2009, he was nominated for Best Improvised Jazz Solo for his solo on Cole Porter's "All of You" from his debut album, Two-Shade. His nomination competed with established jazz musicians Terence Blanchard and Roy Hargrove, with whom Clayton toured for several years.

The Clayton Brothers' Brother to Brother received a nomination in the Best Jazz Instrumental Album category. Gerald Clayton plays piano on the album, which holds loosely to a theme of songs that were made famous by Thad, Hank and Elvin Jones. Clayton's piano playing was described by Ben Ratliff of The New York Times as "[filling] up the available space" with Clayton "busying himself with prettiness and authority...If you've listened to much hard bop or mainstream jazz of the early '60s, you might find some easygoing clichés in his playing – or maybe even an awful lot of them – but they are smoothly rendered. More important, the friendly rhetoric of this music allows them."

Clayton is the son of American jazz bassist John Clayton.

Discography

Studio albums

Collaborative albums

Live albums

Singles

As lead artist

As featured artist

Guest appearances

Piano credits

Awards and nominations

References

External links
Gerald Clayton official website
Flickr photos of Gerald Clayton
"Gerald Clayton Trio: Live At The Village Vanguard", NPR
Gerald Clayton Interview with Linus Wyrsch, breakthruradio.com, November 2010

1984 births
Living people
Dutch emigrants to the United States
USC Thornton School of Music alumni
American jazz pianists
American male pianists
Los Angeles County High School for the Arts alumni
African-American jazz musicians
21st-century American pianists
21st-century American male musicians
American male jazz musicians
Clayton-Hamilton Jazz Orchestra members
Motéma Music artists
Verve Records artists
Concord Records artists
African-American pianists
21st-century African-American musicians
20th-century African-American people
Blue Note Records artists
ArtistShare artists